Alberto González Mas (born 15 November 1958) is a Chilean sailor. He competed in the 470 event at the 1984 Summer Olympics.

References

External links
 
 
 

1958 births
Living people
Chilean male sailors (sport)
Olympic sailors of Chile
Sailors at the 1984 Summer Olympics – 470
Place of birth missing (living people)